Jake Ross Scott (born April 16, 1981) is a former American football offensive guard. Scott played college football at Idaho, where he walked-on and became a four-year starter, and was selected by the Indianapolis Colts in the fifth round of the 2004 NFL Draft. With the Colts, Scott won Super Bowl XLI over the Chicago Bears. He also played for the Tennessee Titans and Philadelphia Eagles, and was a member of the Detroit Lions before his retirement.

Early years
Born and raised in Lewiston, Idaho, Scott graduated from Lewiston High in 1999. He played on the offensive line all four years for the Bengals and threw the discus and shot put on the track team.

College career
He played college football at the University of Idaho, where he walked-on and redshirted his first year. He was a four-year starter for the Vandals (2000–03), starting in 46 games at weak-side tackle for head coach Tom Cable.  Scott earned a bachelor's degree in civil engineering in 2003.

Professional career

Indianapolis Colts
In the 2004 NFL Draft, Scott was taken in the 5th round with the 141st selection.  He started nine games in his rookie year and was selected for the 2004 Football Digest All-Rookie Team.  Scott started all 16 games in 2005 and 2006, including the post-season and Super Bowl XLI, a victory over the Chicago Bears in February 2007.

Tennessee Titans
Following four seasons with the Colts, he signed a four-year deal with the Tennessee Titans on March 10, 2008, worth approximately $5 million per season.

Philadelphia Eagles
On November 12, 2012, the Eagles signed Scott and released Julian Vandervelde.

Detroit Lions
Scott signed with the Detroit Lions on June 4, 2013. He was cut on August 31, 2013, as part of the final round of cuts before the 2013 season.

References

External links
Philadelphia Eagles - bio - Jake Scott
Tennessee Titans - bio - Jake Scott
YouTube.com - Jake Scott - December 2012

1981 births
Living people
People from Lewiston, Idaho
Players of American football from Idaho
American football offensive guards
Idaho Vandals football players
Indianapolis Colts players
Tennessee Titans players
Philadelphia Eagles players
Detroit Lions players